Figueroa is a Spanish surname.

Figueroa may also refer to:

Places
Figueroa (Santurce), a subbarrio in San Juan, Puerto Rico
Figueroa Department of Argentina
Figueroa Mountain in the U.S. state of California

Other uses
Alférez FAP David Figueroa Fernandini Airport, airport serving Huanuco, Peru
Figueroa Street, 30-mile long street in Los Angeles, California
Figueroa Street Tunnels, series of tunnels on the Pasadena Freeway in Los Angeles, California
Figueroa v. Canada, Canadian Supreme Court case involving the rights of political parties